Kingswood Country is an Australian sitcom that screened from 1980 to 1984 on the Seven Network. The series started on 30 January 1980 and was a spin-off from the sketch on comedy program  The Naked Vicar Show that had featured Ross Higgins as blustering suburban father, Ted Bullpitt. It was written by Gary Reilly and Tony Sattler and produced by their production company, RS Productions. The show won Logie Awards for Best Comedy in 1981 and 1982, and was briefly revived in a spin-off in 1997 titled Bullpitt, although it proved less successful.

Premise
The show is a family sitcom focusing on the main character, Edward Melba "Ted" Bullpitt (Ross Higgins), a white Australian, conservative, Holden Kingswood-loving putty factory worker and WWII veteran and his interactions with his more progressive wife and two adult children.

He lives for three things: his beloved chair in front of the TV, his unsuccessful racing greyhounds Repco Lad and Gay Akubra and his Holden Kingswood car (late in the show's run Ted traded-in the Kingswood, which had gone out of production around the time the series began, for Holden's replacement mid-range family car, the Commodore). His long-suffering wife, the vague and dithering Thelma (Judi Farr), was cast as a traditional housewife trapped by Ted's conservative family views, but she often got her own back on Ted (this often included using old Myer receipts she had hidden in a drawer to fool Ted into thinking she paid less for a new item, often clothes, than she really had).

Ted's Kingswood is never shown on any episode.

Humour was generated by the conflict of Ted's traditional views and his children's progressive nature. For example, his son Craig (Peter Fisher) is portrayed as a sexually rampant medical student and is referred to as an "Al Grassby Groupie". His daughter, Greta (Laurel McGowan), is portrayed as a feminist and is married to Bruno (Lex Marinos), the son of Italian immigrants, to whom Ted objects (often referring to him as a "bloody wog"). Other politically incorrect humour includes Ted's references to Neville, the concrete Aboriginal garden statue. This was named after Australia's first Aboriginal Senator, Neville Bonner, who enjoyed it so much he visited the show's recording.

At other times, humour was based on the more traditional comedic methods of poorly thought-out schemes of Ted's (usually get-rich-quick); class differences (between the suburban Bullpitts and Ted's 'Datsun dealer' brother Bob and his upwardly-mobile wife Merle) and simple misunderstandings leading to a chain of humorous events.

Guest stars on Kingwood Country
Guest stars in the series included Graham Kennedy, Robert Hughes, Noeline Brown, Cornelia Frances, Ray Meagher, Henri Szeps and Bruce Spence, amongst others.

Cast and characters

Catchphrases 
The series has spawned some catchphrases such as:
 "Don't 'Dad' me boy/girl, I'm your father!". "Don't 'Mum and Dad' us boy/girl, we're your parents" was also used.
 "Pickle me grandmother!"
 [when surprised from behind] "Strewth! Give a man a heart attack!"
 "Strike me Catholic!"
 [when someone asks to drink his beer] "Put the money on the fridge!". Sometimes changed to "Put the money on the fridge Wog!" when Bruno asked Ted for a beer.
 "Somebody/someone should blow [current object of annoyance] up!" e.g. "Someone should blow those nuns up!"
 "The Kingswood! You're not taking the Kingswood!..." [insert far-fetched excuse] e.g. "I've just ducoed the tyres" or "I've just glad-wrapped the aerial!" or "I've just Mr Sheened the number-plate!"
 "When I was a boy... " [insert long-winded, far-fetched story] Always responded to with "Yeah, yeah sure Ted/Dad."
 "Hate, hate, vomit!"
 [when asked how his day went] "Bloody shambles, of course!"
 [the universal insult for a miserable, miserly old man] "Grumblebum!"
 [in response to someone mishearing his surname] "No, it's Bull-PITT.  Yes - everyone says that". Also said often by Thelma when talking on the phone.
 "Where's the bloody Kingswood?"
 "Attila the Nun"
 "Bloody wogs!"
 "Bloody woman!"
 "Blow 'em all up!"
 "Watch it mate!"
 "No wonder the country's in a mess"
 "I win, you lose, and I'm the king of the castle"
 "Bloody nuns"
 "Never marry a woman mate"
 "Where's my paper? "

Episodes

Home media
A 'Best Of' DVD was released in 2003 featuring 13 out of the 89 episodes as well as the original skit on The Naked Vicar Show that spawned the series. A second 'Best Of' featuring an additional 13 episodes was also released in 2006. Then in September 2008 a third best of set was released. On 12 May 2010 The Best of Kingswood Country Volume 4 was released with another 13 episodes, which will mean that 52 out of 89 episodes will be available on DVD commercially.

The Complete Series collection was released as an 11 disc DVD box set on 4 December 2019, from Via Vision Entertainment. It contains all 89 episodes of the show.

Spin-off

A spin-off to the series was the short-lived, much panned Bullpitt! in 1997. Of the original show's cast, only Ross Higgins had a regular role. Elaine Lee co-starred. A Best of Set was released in September 2008.

See also
 Alf Garnett from Till Death Us Do Part, a similar British comedy.
 Archie Bunker from All in the Family, a similar American comedy (adapted from Till Death Us Do Part).

References

External links
 
 Kingswood Country at the National Film and Sound Archive
 Kingswood Country – Episode 19 at Australian Screen Online

1980 Australian television series debuts
1984 Australian television series endings
Australian television sitcoms
Australian television spin-offs
Television shows set in Sydney
Seven Network original programming